A Change of Heart may refer to:

 "A Change of Heart" (How I Met Your Mother), an episode of the TV series How I Met Your Mother
 A Change of Heart (TV series), a Hong Kong television series
 A Change of Heart (album), a 1987 album by David Sanborn
 "A Change of Heart" (Bernard Butler song), 1998
 "A Change of Heart" (The 1975 song), 2016
 A Father for Brittany (also known as A Change of Heart), a 1998 Lifetime television film
 A Change of Heart, a 1998 TV movie starring Jean Smart
 A Change of Heart (film), a 2017 comedy film starring Jim Belushi

See also
 Change of Heart (disambiguation)